Hartnoll is an English surname. Notable people with the surname include:

 Paul Hartnoll (born 1968), British musician, founder of Orbital
 Phil Hartnoll (born 1965), British musician, founder of Orbital
 Phyllis Hartnoll (1906–1997), British poet, author and editor
 William Hartnoll (1841–1932), Australian politician

See also
 Hartnell

English-language surnames